The 2023 Trophee Tourisme Endurance - Formula Renault Cup will be the third season of the championship. The Formula Renault series is one class of the Trophee Tourisme Endurance, a program started in 2009 with approval of the FFSA comprising multiple endurance and sprint championships across different classes of motor racing.

Teams and drivers 
All drivers will be competing using Formula Renault machinery.

Race calendar 
The 2023 calendar was announced on 4 October 2022 and will consist of the same seven circuits as the 2022 season. A pre-season test will also be held at Circuit de Nevers Magny-Cours on 24 February. All rounds will be held in France.

References

External links 

 Official website: 

TTE Formula Renault Cup
TTE Formula Renault Cup
TTE Formula Renault Cup